Rogel Mari D. Sese is a Filipino astrophysicist who is known for being a proponent of space science in the Philippines.

Early life and education
According to Sese himself, he decided to pursue a career related to space science as early as when he was five years old. His mother was biological sciences professor at the University of the Philippines Los Baños (UPLB) taught him in biology such as on how to splice a DNA but did not find sufficient interest in the field. He attended University of the Philippines Rural High School. Sese having developed interest in physics while in high school pursued a degree in applied physics at the UPLB which he believed to be the closest to an astrophysics degree since he was not able to find a university which offers such degree at that time and decided to specialize in instrumentation development and design. He attained his master's degree at the Diliman campus of the same university.

He pursued a doctorate degree in physics at the University of Tsukuba in Japan and took computational astrophysics as his specialization. He attained his doctorate degree in 2009 and moved back to the Philippines in 2011.

Career
After graduating from the University of the Philippines Diliman, Sese worked at the Los Baños campus as an instructor. He briefly stopped teaching to pursue a doctorate degree in Japan. As one of the only three astrophysicists in the Philippines as of 2017, Sese joined the Department of Science and Technology and served as the head of the National Space Development Program which was launched in order to set up the foundation of a future space agency. He also set up his own firm, Regulus SpaceTech Inc. which is involved in space research and development, education and consultancy.

He also promoted the teaching of space education in high schools and elementary schools through the Philippine Space Science Education Program (PSSEP) which also led to more universities in the Philippines to offer degrees in aerospace engineering and also lobbied for legislation related to space science. He contributed to the writing of the proposed legislation "Act Establishing the Philippine Space Development and Utilization Policy and Creating the Philippine Space Agency" which aims to establish a national space agency.

Sese along with 7 other Filipino scientists were included in Asian Scientist 100 (AS100) list released in March 2018 which recognizes the contribution of individuals in Asia in the field of science and technology. Their inclusion was recognized by the Senate of the Philippines via a resolution.

Sese is currently affiliated with Ateneo de Davao University (ADDU) and is the current department chairperson of the Aerospace Engineering department. He is also a member of Ateneo de Davao University's board of trustees. He is currently leading a satellite internet project in ADDU, the ACCESS Mindanao project.

Personal life
Sese is married and has two children.

References

Living people
Filipino astrophysicists
Filipino expatriates in Japan
People from Laguna (province)
University of the Philippines Los Baños alumni
University of the Philippines Diliman alumni
University of Tsukuba alumni
Year of birth missing (living people)